Randall Marsack Carrington (31 March 1934 – 20 December 2018) was a New Zealand cricketer who bowled left-arm spin. He played five first-class matches for Auckland in 1953/54.

See also
 List of Auckland representative cricketers

References

External links
 

1934 births
2018 deaths
New Zealand cricketers
Auckland cricketers
Cricketers from Whangārei